Danny Henry (born 17 July 1988) is a Scottish professional mixed martial artist currently competing in the Featherweight division of the Ultimate Fighting Championship.

Mixed martial arts career

Early career
Henry began his MMA career in 2011. Before joining the UFC, Henry amassed a record of 10-2. Henry fought the majority of his fights in South Africa with EFC Worldwide and in his final fight for their promotion beat Igeu Kabesa for their featherweight championship.

Ultimate Fighting Championship
Henry made his promotional debut on 16 July 2017 at UFC Fight Night 113 against Daniel Teymur. He won the fight by unanimous decision earning Fight of the Night honors.

Henry faced Hakeem Dawodu on 17 March 2018 at UFC Fight Night 127. He won his fight against the sizable favourite Dawodu via guillotine 39 seconds into the first round.

Henry faced Dan Ige at UFC Fight Night 147 on 16 March 2019. He lost the fight via a rear-naked choke submission in the first round.

Henry was briefly linked to a bout with Mike Davis on 26 September 2019 at UFC Fight Night 160. However, Henry pulled out of the bout for undisclosed reasons in mid-September. In turn, Davis was pulled from the card and is expected to be rescheduled for a future event.

Henry was expected to face promotional newcomer Peter Barrett on 25 April 2020. However, on 9 April, Dana White, the president of UFC, announced that this event would be postponed to a future date

Henry faced Makwan Amirkhani on 12 July 2020 at UFC 251. He lost the fight via a submission in round one.

Henry was expected to face Ricardo Ramos on 3 September 2022 at UFC Fight Night 209.  However, the bout was cancelled after Henry withdrew for unknown reasons.

Championships and awards
 Ultimate Fighting Championship
 Fight of the Night vs. Daniel Teymur 
Extreme Fighting Championship (EFC)
EFC Featherweight World Championship (Two times)

Mixed martial arts record

|-
|Loss
|align=center|12–4
|Makwan Amirkhani
| Technical Submission (anaconda choke)
|UFC 251 
|
|align=center|1
|align=center|3:15
|Abu Dhabi, United Arab Emirates
|
|-
|Loss
|align=center|12–3
|Dan Ige
|Submission (rear-naked choke)
|UFC Fight Night: Till vs. Masvidal 
|
|align=center|1
|align=center|1:17
|London, England
|
|-
|Win
|align=center| 12–2
|Hakeem Dawodu
|Technical Submission (guillotine choke)
|UFC Fight Night: Werdum vs. Volkov 
|
|align=center|1
|align=center|0:39
|London, England
|
|-
|Win
|align=center|11–2
|Daniel Teymur
|Decision (unanimous)
|UFC Fight Night: Nelson vs. Ponzinibbio
|
|align=center|3
|align=center|5:00
|Glasgow, Scotland
|
|-
|Win
|align=center| 10–2
|Igeu Kabesa
|Submission (anaconda choke)
|Extreme Fighting Championship 57
|
|align=center|1
|align=center|3:30
|Johannesburg, South Africa
|
|-
|Win
|align=center| 9–2
|Wade Groth
|TKO (punches)
|Extreme Fighting Championship 53
|
|align=center|2
|align=center|0:39
|Johannesburg, South Africa
|
|-
|Win
|align=center| 8–2
|Barend Nienaber
|TKO (body kick)
|Extreme Fighting Championship 51
|
|align=center|2
|align=center|1:20
|Johannesburg, South Africa
|
|-
|Loss
|align=center| 7–2
|Igeu Kabesa
|Decision (unanimous)
|Extreme Fighting Championship 47
|
|align=center|5
|align=center|5:00
|Johannesburg, South Africa
|
|-
|Win
|align=center| 7–1
|Boyd Allen
|TKO (punches)
|Extreme Fighting Championship 44
|
|align=center|4
|align=center|2:31
|Johannesburg, South Africa
|
|-
|Win
|align=center|6–1
|Matthew Buirski
|Decision (unanimous)
|Extreme Fighting Championship 42
|
|align=center|3
|align=center|5:00
|Cape Town, South Africa
|
|-
|Win
|align=center|5–1
|Hanru Botha
|Submission (triangle choke)
|Extreme Fighting Championship 40
|
|align=center|1
|align=center|1:58
|Gauteng, South Africa
|
|-
|Win
|align=center|4–1
|David Galbraith
|TKO (punches)
|Headhunters FC
|
|align=center|2
|align=center|N/A
|Edinburgh, Scotland
|
|-
|Loss
|align=center|3–1
|Michael Doyle
|Decision (unanimous)
|On Top 6
|
|align=center|3
|align=center|5:00
|Glasgow, Scotland
|
|-
|Win
|align=center|3–0
|Leon Del Gaudio
|KO (punch)
|On Top 5
|
|align=center|1
|align=center|0:17
|Glasgow, Scotland
|
|-
|Win
|align=center|2–0
|Kieran Malone
|Submission (rear-naked choke)
|On Top 4
|
|align=center|1
|align=center|4:04
|Glasgow, Scotland
|
|-
|Win
|align=center|1–0
|Danny Grayson
|Submission (rear-naked choke)
|Sportfight Scotland 14
|
|align=center|2
|align=center|3:32
|Lanark, Scotland
|

References

External links
 
 

Living people
1988 births
Sportspeople from Edinburgh
Scottish male mixed martial artists
Featherweight mixed martial artists
Ultimate Fighting Championship male fighters